The 1948 Claxton Shield (at the time known as either the 1948 Australian Carnival or the 1948 Interstate Carnival) was the ninth annual Claxton Shield, an Australian national baseball tournament. It was held in Perth, Western Australia from 7 to 14 August, and was won by Victoria for the second time overall, successfully defending their title from 1947. The other participants were South Australia, New South Wales, and hosts Western Australia.

Format
As had been the case in all previous tournaments where there had been four teams, each team played a round-robin schedule, meeting each other team once, with two competition points were on offer in each game. The points were awarded as follows:
 Win – two points
 Tie – one point
 Loss – no points
At the end of these preliminary games, the top two teams played each other to determine the champions, while the remaining two teams faced each other to determine third place.

Results

Preliminaries

Finals

Third place final

Championship game

All-Australian team
At the conclusion of the tournament, representatives from the Australian Baseball Council selected an All-Australian team. It was the fourth such Australian team selected at the end of a Claxton Shield tournament.

References

Bibliography
 
 

Claxton Shield
Claxton Shield
Claxton Shield
August 1948 sports events in Australia